Ed Byrne is an American trombonist, composer, bandleader, author, and educator.

Byrne worked in New York City a soloist. He has performed, composed, and arranged recordings and toured the Americas, France, Germany and Sweden. He has taught at Berklee and published books on improvisation. His debut album Conquistador was released by Blue Truffle in 2012. Byrne has a doctorate in Jazz Studies from the New England Conservatory. He was nominated Best Trombone Soloist by Latin New York magazine. His composition "Fenway Funk"  was nominated for a Grammy Award.

Discography

As leader
 Conquistador (2012)

As sideman
With Willie Colón & Mon Rivera
 There Goes the Neighborhood (1975)

With Manu Dibango
 Gone Clear (1998)

With Gerry Mulligan and Chet Baker
 Carnegie Hall Concert  (1974)

With Eddie Palmieri
 Unfinished Masterpiece (1975)

With Seguida
 On Our Way to Tomorrow (1976)

References

External links
Official site

Trombonists
Latin jazz trombonists
Place of birth missing (living people)
Year of birth missing (living people)
Latin jazz composers
Living people
21st-century trombonists
American jazz trombonists